is a railway station located in the city of Ōdate, Akita Prefecture, Japan, operated by the East Japan Railway Company (JR East).

Lines

Station layout
The station consists of a single island platform serving two tracks, connected to the station building by a level crossing. The station is unattended.

Platforms

History
Ōtaki-Onsen Station was opened on January 19, 1915 on the privately owned Akita Railways, serving the town of Jūnisho, Akita. The line was nationalized on June 1, 1934, becoming part of the Japanese Government Railways (JGR) system, which became the Japan National Railways (JNR) after World War II. The station was absorbed into the JR East network upon the privatization of the JNR on April 1, 1987.

Surrounding area
 Ōtaki Onsen
  Bypass

See also
 List of Railway Stations in Japan

External links

  JR East Station information 

Railway stations in Japan opened in 1915
Railway stations in Akita Prefecture
Stations of East Japan Railway Company
Ōdate
Hanawa Line